Double O Radio was a privately held media corporation with corporate headquarters in Charleston, South Carolina. At its peak, Double O Radio owned 28 radio stations in the United States.

On August 8, 2011, Double O announced it would merge with Townsquare Media and become part of the Oaktree Capital Management broadcast empire.

The Panama City, Florida and Columbia, South Carolina clusters were not part of the transaction, and continued to be held by Double O's parent company, Pilot Group LLC. The Panama City cluster would be spun off on April 11, 2012 to Louisiana-based Powell Broadcasting for $950,000. The Columbia stations would later be spun off to a local broadcaster, Hometown Columbia.

U.S. radio stations owned by Double O Radio

Central New York
WBKT 95.3 FM, Norwich
WCHN 970 AM, Norwich 
WDLA 1270 AM, Walton 
WDHI 100.3 FM, Delhi 
WIYN 94.7 FM, Deposit
WKXZ 93.9 FM, Norwich 
WZOZ 103.1 FM, Oneonta
WSRK 103.9 FM, Oneonta 
WDOS 730 AM, Oneonta
WTBD 97.5 FM Delhi

Columbia, South Carolina
WWNU 92.1 FM, Irmo
WWNQ 94.3 FM, Forest Acres

Panama City, Florida
WASJ 105.1 FM, Panama City Beach
WKNK 103.5 FM, Callaway
WPFM 107.9 FM, Panama City 
WRBA 95.9 FM, Springfield

Odessa-Midland, Texas
KHKX 99.1 FM, Odessa
KMCM 96.9 FM, Odessa 
KQRX 95.1 FM, Midland

San Angelo, Texas
KELI 98.7 FM, San Angelo
KKCN 103.1 FM, Ballinger
KGKL 960 AM / 97.5 FM, San Angelo 
KNRX 96.5 FM, Sterling City

Missouri
KRRY 100.9 FM, Canton
KICK-FM 97.9 FM, Palmyra
KHMO 1070 AM, Hannibal
KSDL 92.3 FM, Sedalia
KSIS 1050 AM, Sedalia 
KXKX 105.7 FM, Knob Noster
WLIQ 1530 AM, Quincy, IL

References

Defunct broadcasting companies of the United States
Defunct radio broadcasting companies of the United States
Defunct companies based in South Carolina
Mass media in Charleston, South Carolina
Privately held companies based in South Carolina
2003 establishments in South Carolina
2011 disestablishments in South Carolina